Melham may refer to:

Daryl Melham, an Australian politician
Melham, South Dakota, a community in the United States
melham, the verb